Lakshmi Kant Jha, MBE (22 November 1913 – 16 January 1988), born in Darbhanga district, Bihar was the eighth Governor of the Reserve Bank of India from 1 July 1967 to 3 May 1970.

Education and career
Lakshmi Kant Jha was born into a Maithil Brahmin family in Darbhanga, Bihar. He was a member of the 1936 batch of the Indian Civil Service. He was educated at Benares Hindu University (BHU), Trinity College, Cambridge University, and London School of Economics. He studied economics at Cambridge when Keynes was teaching there. Jha was taught by another eminent teacher Harold Laski at the LSE.  Jha rose to be a Deputy Secretary in the Department of Supply, during British rule and was appointed an MBE for his service in the 1946 New Year Honours. After Independence he had served as secretary in the Ministries of Industries, Commerce and Finance and Secretary to the Prime Minister of India, Lal Bahadur Shastri (1964–66) and Indira Gandhi (1966–67) prior to his appointment as Governor of RBI.

Major works and achievements

During his tenure the Indian Rupee notes of denominations of  2, 5, 10, and 100, commemorating the birth centenary of Mahatma Gandhi were released on 2 October 1969, these notes bear his signature, both in English and Hindi. The signature in Hindi, the official language of the Government of India, appeared on the currency notes for the first time during his stewardship of the RBI. A subsequent re-issue on this series notes bears the signature of B. N. Adarkar. His tenure also saw nationalization of 14 major commercial banks, introduction of social controls over commercial banks, establishment of National Credit Council, and the introduction of Lead Bank Scheme to facilitate credit delivery. Amongst other developments, gold controls were brought on a statutory basis; Deposit Insurance was in principle extended to Cooperative banks; and the setting up of the Agricultural Credit Board was undertaken.

He served as India's ambassador to the United States during the crucial period 1970–73 when India fought a war with Pakistan and liberated Bangladesh. Kissinger has acknowledged his persuasive diplomatic skills in the book White House Years.  Jha authored a few books including Mr. Red Tape and Economic Strategy for the 80s: Priorities for the Seventh Plan. He was governor of Jammu and Kashmir state from 3 July 1973 to 22 February 1981.His role as an impartial Head of State is still remembered with affection and respect in J&K. He was a member of the Brandt Commission during the 1980s on the North -South economic issues . He was chairman of the Economic Administration Reforms Commission of the Govt. of India from 1981–88. He also served as the adviser on economic matters to the P.M. Indira Gandhi and later to the P.M. Rajiv Gandhi. At the time of his death, Jha was a member of the Rajya Sabha. In 1990, the RBI instituted the L.K. Jha Memorial Lectures in commemoration of his memory.

References

External links

Governors of the Reserve Bank of India
Indian bankers
Indian civil servants
Ambassadors of India to the United States
Governors of Jammu and Kashmir
Indian Members of the Order of the British Empire
Indian Civil Service (British India) officers
1913 births
1988 deaths
People from Bhagalpur
Rajya Sabha members from Bihar